Nether Wyresdale is a civil parish in the Wyre district of Lancashire, England.  It contains 23 listed buildings that are recorded in the National Heritage List for England.  All the listed buildings are designated at Grade II, the lowest of the three grades, which is applied to "buildings of national importance and special interest".  The parish includes the villages of Scorton, the southern part of the village of Dolphinholme, and the countryside between and around them.  Most of the listed buildings are houses, cottages, country houses and associated structures, and farmhouses.  Also listed are a medieval cross base, a milestone, bridges, and churches and associated structures.


Buildings

References

Citations

Sources

Lists of listed buildings in Lancashire
Buildings and structures in the Borough of Wyre